Sidney da Silva Souza known as Sidney (born 12 September 1972) is a Brazilian footballer who plays for Cerâmica. Sidney spent most of his career in Rio Grande do Sul.

Biography
After played for Pelotas at 2005 Campeonato Gaúcho, he was signed by Novo Hamburgo and played at 2005 Campeonato Brasileiro Série C. His contract was extended in January 2006 and played at 2006 Campeonato Gaúcho. In March 2006 he was signed by Brasil de Farroupilha of Campeonato Gaúcho Second Division and released in June. In June 2006 he signed a 1-year contract with Ulbra, for 2006 Copa FGF. in April 2007 he was signed by Ulbra Ji-Paraná in 3 months deal. He then played for Brasil de Farroupilha at 2007 Copa FGF. In February 2008 he signed a new -year contract with Brasil de Farroupilha. After played for the club at 2008 Campeonato Gaúcho Segunda Divisão and 2008 Copa FGF, he was signed by Esportivo de Bento Gonçalves in February 2009. After 2009 Campeonato Gaúcho, he was signed by Cerâmica in 1-year deal. He played for the club at 2009 Copa FGF and 2010 Campeonato Gaúcho. In September 2010 he signed a new 1-year deal and finished as the runner-up of 2010 Copa FGF. He was sent off in the first leg on the final.

References

External links
 
 Cerâmica Profile 

Brazilian footballers
Esporte Clube Pelotas players
Esporte Clube Novo Hamburgo players
Canoas Sport Club players
Cerâmica Atlético Clube players
Association football midfielders
1972 births
Living people